BrainRush (spelled BrainRu$h) is a live-action game show on Cartoon Network, hosted by Lamorne Morris and, to a lesser extent, Sarah Karges. It first aired on June 20, 2009, with its last episode airing on July 22, ending after one season. 

Like many shows during Cartoon Network's late-2000s dalliance with live-action programming, this show is also notable for being a more modern example of lost media; five of the six episodes can be found on the internet, with only a brief clip existing for the remaining episode.

Format
Unwitting contestants are asked to answer trivia questions on roller coasters. The show takes place at Knott's Berry Farm in Buena Park, California.

Round 1: Quick Quiz (Boomerang)
The host sits on the Boomerang. Anyone who sits next to the host becomes a contestant. Each contestant is asked a series of questions over the course of the ride. (As noted in episode 4, the total ride time is one minute and 45 seconds.) Each correct answer is worth $25. The 2 contestants with the most money advance to the second round.

In the event of a tie, a tiebreaker question with a numerical answer is asked (generally, the question is about the Boomerang coaster). The contestant whose guess is the closest to the correct answer without going over moves on. The eliminated contestant is paid his/her winnings immediately.

Round 2 (Silver Bullet)
Each of the remaining two players picks one of two games, hidden in two colored envelopes. The player with the least earnings from level 1 goes first. Generally, each part of the game is worth $50 and both games have the same amount of money available ($300). The money from both rounds are combined, and the person with the most money at the end of this round wins the game. The losing contestant is paid his or her winnings immediately. If there is a tie at the end of round 2, a numerical question is asked in a similar manner to round one.

Games in Round 2
Street Wise: The host tells the player five letters of the alphabet during the ride. At the end of the ride, the player must remember those five letters. Each letter correctly recalled is worth $50. In addition, regardless of the player's performance, the player is given the five correct letters, and must unscramble them into a slang word based on a clue given by the host. If the player unscrambles the word within 30 seconds, he or she wins another $50.

Regurgitator: The player is read a short story (typically an article from USA Today) as the coaster moves up the lift hill. He or she is then asked six questions about the story over the course of the ride. Each correct answer is worth $50.

Represent: During the ride, the host tells the player three random words, and there are three random pictures shown around the park. After the ride, the player can list any of the words or pictures for $50 each.

Hurling Hangman: The player looks for three letters while on the ride. At the end of the ride, they can recall the letters for $50 each. Afterward, they use the letters to complete three words within a time limit of 10 seconds; each word correctly completed is worth a further $50.

Round 3: Motor Mouth (Xcelerator)
The contestant selects one of four categories for the round. Prior to the start of the final level, he/she is given the chance to eat a food item for a $100 bonus. The contestant must eat the entire dish to earn the bonus.

Categories
 Zap-Pow - Superheroes & comic books
 Penalty Box - Sports
 Watch-Out - Television & movies
 Know It All - General knowledge

The contestant is asked a question with multiple answers, and must give as many correct answers as possible over the course of the ride (a total of 24 seconds in length). The first correct answer is worth $50; each additional correct answer is worth $50 more than the previous one (for example, giving 5 correct answers wins $750, or $50+$100+$150+$200+$250).

Afterwards, he/she is given the option of keeping all their winnings or risking half of it on one final question. The contestant sits on the coaster in the station to answer the question. If the contestant gives the correct answer (the light turns green), he or she doubles his/her winnings and the coaster takes off immediately, however, if the answer is incorrect (light turns red), the contestant loses half of their total (the total is rounded down in the event of halving an odd amount). In the later event, the host offers the player a final ride anyway. Regardless of the result, the $100 bonus for eating the food is not doubled or halved.

Broadcast
The show premiered on June 20, 2009 as part of Cartoon Network's live-action programming block, CN Real. The first 4 episodes premiered on Saturday nights at 8:00pm ET. However, when the Saturday night CN Real block was removed, the remaining 2 episodes premiered on Wednesday nights at 8:00pm ET.

Episodes

Winnings

  Contestant answered bonus question correctly and passed.
  Contestant answered bonus question incorrectly and was eliminated.
* These contestants lost on the tiebreaker question in round 1.

See also
 Cash Cab

References

2000s American game shows
2009 American television series debuts
2009 American television series endings
Cartoon Network original programming
English-language television shows
Television shows set in Orange County, California